Omphalotropis vohimenae is a species of minute salt marsh snail with an operculum, a terrestrial gastropod mollusk, or micromollusk, in the family Assimineidae.

This species is endemic to Madagascar.  Its natural habitat is subtropical or tropical dry forests.

References

Omphalotropis
Molluscs of Madagascar
Gastropods described in 1999
Taxonomy articles created by Polbot